Sander Arends and Mateusz Kowalczyk were the defending champions but only Arends chose to defend his title, partnering Antonio Šančić.

Arends successfully defended his title after defeating Scott Clayton and Divij Sharan 6–4, 7–5 in the final.

Seeds

Draw

References
 Main Draw

Brest Challenger - Doubles